Lost Seal Stream is a glacial meltwater stream,  long, draining from the west margin of Commonwealth Glacier into the northeast end of Lake Fryxell, in Taylor Valley, Victoria Land, Antarctica. The name was suggested by Diane McKnight, leader of a United States Geological Survey team that studied the hydrology of streams flowing into Lake Fryxell in several seasons, 1987–94, and commemorates the encounter with a living Weddell seal. The seal wandered into the area north of Lake Fryxell during November 1990 and was evacuated by helicopter to New Harbour after it entered the camp area. A mummified seal is prominent at the mouth of the stream.

References

Rivers of Victoria Land
McMurdo Dry Valleys